David Glass may refer to:

David Glass (businessman) (1935–2020), American executive
David Glass (Canadian politician) (1829–1906), Canadian lawyer and political figure
David Glass (Israeli politician) (1936–2014), Israeli politician
David Glass (sociologist) (1911–1978), British demographer and professor of sociology